The 2010 FIVB Women's World Championship was the sixteenth edition of the competition. Like the previous tournament, the 2010 edition also was held from 29 October to 14 November 2010 in Japan, though the range of venues and locations was modified slightly (Matsumoto and Hamamatsu replaced Sapporo and Kobe in 2010). Twenty-four teams participated in the tournament.

The tournament was won by Russia, who finished with a perfect record, defeating Brazil in the intense final game. Japan defeated the United States for the third place, winning their first bronze medal in the tournament history, and the first medal since 1978, having so far three gold and three silver already to their name. Russia won its second straight title, while Brazil was prevented from achieving a volleyball double of winning both the men's championship and the women's championship in the same year.

Russia's towering outside hitter Yekaterina Gamova was named the tournament Most Valuable Player.

Qualification

Squads

Venues
The tournament was played at six venues in five cities.

Format
The tournament was played in three different stages (first, second and final rounds). A single round-robin format was played within each group to determine the teams group position, the four best teams of each group (total of 16 teams) progressed to the next round.

The six best teams of each group (total of 12 teams) progressed to the next round.

First and second of each group played the semifinals, third and fourth played the 5th-8th semifinals and fifth and sixth played the 9th-12th semifinals. Winners and losers of each semifinals played a final placement match for 1st to 12th places.

Source:FIVB

Pools composition
Teams were seeded in the first three positions of each pool following the Serpentine system according to their FIVB World Ranking. FIVB reserved the right to seed the hosts as head of Pool A regardless of the World Ranking. All teams not seeded were drawn to take other available positions in the remaining lines, following the World Ranking. The drawing was held in November 2009. The rankings displayed in this table are from August 2010.

Results
All times are Japan Standard Time (UTC+09:00).

First round

Pool A
Venue: Yoyogi National Gymnasium, Tokyo

|}

|}

Pool B
Venue: Hamamatsu Arena, Hamamatsu

|}

|}

Pool C
Venue: Matsumoto City Gymnasium, Matsumoto

|}

|}

Pool D
Venue: Osaka Municipal Central Gymnasium, Osaka

|}

|}

Second round
The results and the points of the matches between the same teams that were already played during the first round are taken into account for the second round.

Pool E
Venue: Yoyogi National Gymnasium, Tokyo

|}

|}

Pool F
Venue: Nippon Gaishi Hall, Nagoya

|}

|}

Final round

9th–12th place
Venues: Yoyogi National Gymnasium (YNG) and Tokyo Metropolitan Gymnasium (TMG), both in Tokyo

9th–12th semifinals

|}

11th place match

|}

9th place match

|}

5th–8th place
Venue: Tokyo Metropolitan Gymnasium, Tokyo

5th–8th semifinals

|}

7th place match

|}

5th place match

|}

Finals
Venue: Yoyogi National Gymnasium, Tokyo

Semifinals

|}

3rd place match

|}

Final
The final was a repeat of the 2006 final, between Russia and Brazil. Both teams had cruised through the group stages undefeated, though Brazil got to the final after winning a tough five-set semifinal match with Japan the day before.

Russia was forced to rally from a set down twice, winning in five sets (21–25, 25–17, 20–25, 25–14, 15–11). Russia's 2.02 meter tall Yekaterina Gamova led all scorers with a tournament-high 35 points, while Sheilla Castro led Brazil with 26.

The match was played at the Yoyogi National Stadium in Tokyo in front of a crowd of 12,000.

|}

Final standing

Awards

 Most Valuable Player
  Yekaterina Gamova
 Best Scorer
  Neslihan Darnel
 Best Spiker
  Tatiana Kosheleva
 Best Blocker
  Christiane Fürst
 Best Server
  Maret Grothues

 Best Digger
  Stacy Sykora
 Best Receiver
  Logan Tom
 Best Setter
  Wei Qiuyue
 Best Libero
  Stacy Sykora

References

External links
 Official website
 FIVB

 
FIVB Volleyball Women's World Championship
World Championship
FIVB Women's World Championship
V
October 2010 sports events in Japan
November 2010 sports events in Japan
Women's volleyball in Japan